Lark Davies (born 3 March 1995) is an English rugby union player. She is a Six Nations Grand Slam champion as part of the England women's national rugby team, and plays for Bristol Bears at club level.

International career 
Davies made her international debut playing for England on 28 June 2015, playing against the USA as part of the 2015 Super Series.

She was offered a full time contract by the RFU in January 2019, which was renewed for the 2019-20 season.

Before joining the senior team, Davies made eight appearances for the England women's rugby U20 side. Her first senior start came in the 2018 Women's Six Nations, when England played Italy.

She was a member of the England team for the 2018 Women's Six Nations. In 2019, she played in every game of the tournament helping England to win the grand slam; her second grand slam came in the 2020 Six Nations, in which she played three games.

In 2019 she played in the Super Series in San Diego, USA. England came in second place.

She was named in the England squad for the delayed 2021 Rugby World Cup held in New Zealand in October and November 2022.

Club career 
Davies joined Worcester RFC as a hooker in 2013. She moved to the Worcester Valkyries (now the Worcester Warriors) in 2015 and was promoted to captain of the team in 2017.

She joined Loughborough Lightning in 2019, playing her first game for the club in September.

In 2022 Davies moved to Bristol Bears.

Early life and education 
Davies started playing rugby at aged 10. She played at Orleton Primary School in Ludlow and went on to join Luctonians RFC, Greyhound RFC and Worcester RFC for age group rugby.

She attended Orleton Primary School and Wigmore School before completing her A Levels at Ludlow College. She then went on to study Primary Education at the University of Worcester.

A qualified primary school teacher, she previously taught at Kingsland Church of England Primary School and Carnforth Primary School before being offered her full time rugby contract in 2019.

References

External links
 RFU Player Profile

1995 births
Living people
Alumni of the University of Worcester
England women's international rugby union players
English female rugby union players
Rugby union players from Ludlow
Worcester Warriors players